Charleroi-Central railway station, officially Charleroi-Central, is the main railway station serving Charleroi, Hainaut, Belgium. It is operated by the National Railway Company of Belgium (SNCB/NMBS). Charleroi-Central is also the main TEC bus station in Charleroi, and a station of the Charleroi Metro. Charleroi-Central is the new name of Charleroi-South since December 2022.

History

Early history

The first railway connection to Charleroi was inaugurated in 1843, when the Belgian State Railways (Chemins de fer de l'État Belge) opened an indirect line from Brussels to Charleroi (via Braine-le-Comte), continuing to Namur. On 23 October 1843, a train stopped for the first time in Charleroi. At this time, the station is not more than a temporary building along the rails at the north-west of the actual site. In 1852, the  opened to connect Charleroi with its northern French network, via Erquelinnes.

The opening of the current more direct line to Brussels, via Nivelles and Luttre, took place in 1874. The current station building was inaugurated in October the same year after nine years of works. The building is in neoclassical style and the use of innovative materials such as iron and glass at the time gave it an avant-garde style. The building is a continuation of the work of A.P.J. Lambeau, principal engineer for the Ministry of Railways, who also designed the stations at Namur (1864), Liège-Guillemins (1870), and Mons (1870). In 1949, the line to Brussels was electrified, making the second railway line in Belgium to be electrified after the Brussels–Antwerp line in 1935.

21st century
The station was served by a daily Thalys high-speed rail service to Paris between 1998 and 31 March 2015. In June 2011, after seven years of work, the renovated station was inaugurated. Renovation included the exterior of the 1874 building, the interior (including a new shopping gallery), tunnels, as well as the square in front of the station.

In 2021, work began to improve accessibility to the station. It will include the installation of lifts to access each platform. The station will now be fully accessible to persons with reduced mobility. New ticket offices will be installed, the platform shelters will be modernised and a brand new corridor will be built under the tracks.

Train services
The station is served by the following services:

Intercity services (IC-05) Antwerp - Mechelen - Brussels - Nivelles - Charleroi (weekdays)
Intercity services (IC-19) Lille - Tournai - Saint-Ghislain - Mons - Charleroi - Namur
Intercity services (IC-24) Charleroi - Walcourt - Mariembourg - Couvin
Intercity services (IC-25) Mons - Charleroi - Namur - Huy - Liege (weekdays)
Intercity services (IC-25) Mouscron - Tournai - Saint-Ghislain - Mons - Charleroi - Namur - Huy - Liege - Liers (weekends)
Intercity services (IC-27) Brussels Airport - Brussels-Luxembourg - Nivelles - Charleroi (weekdays)
Intercity services (IC-31) Antwerp - Mechelen - Brussels - Nivelles - Charleroi (weekends)
Intercity services (K82) Maubeuge - Charleroi - Namur
Local services (L-06) Luttre - Manage - La Louvière - Charleroi (weekdays)
Local services (L-06) Manage - La Louvière - Charleroi (weekends)
Local services (L-06A) Manage - Luttre - Charleroi (weekends)
Local services (L-07) Erquelinnes - Lobbes - Charleroi
Local services (L-14) Ottignies - Fleurus - Charleroi - Tamines - Namur - Jambes

In addition to the above services, additional peak time trains are scheduled on weekdays (mornings and end of afternoons).

Metro station

Charleroi-South metro station, simply known as South on network maps, was opened in 1976. Along with Vilette, Sud was the first station to enter service on the Charleroi Metro.

Located at street level, Sud was a terminus station until the opening of the last section of the central loop of the Charleroi Metro, on 27 February 2012. The station features a balloon loop from the times it was a terminus, allowing vehicles entering it from the west to reverse. It is unused since the central loop's completion.

Bus station
Charleroi-South bus station is the main TEC bus transfer point in Charleroi. An express bus line (line A) serves the Brussels South Charleroi Airport.

See also
 List of railway stations in Belgium

References

External links
 
 Official station page at the SNCB website
 Real time departures
 Real time arrivals

Railway stations in Belgium
Railway stations in Belgium opened in 1843
Railway stations in Belgium opened in 1976
1843 establishments in Belgium
Railway stations in Hainaut (province)
Public transport in Charleroi
Buildings and structures in Charleroi